Council of Constantinople can refer to the following church councils (synods) convened in Constantinople (modern day Istanbul, Turkey):


Councils prior to the East–West Schism of 1054 
 Council of Constantinople (360), a local council
 First Council of Constantinople (381), the Second Ecumenical Council
 Council of Constantinople (383), a local council, rejected teachings of Eunomius
 Council of Constantinople (394), a local council, produced several canons
 Council of Constantinople (518), affirmed the Council of Chalcedon (451)
 Council of Constantinople (536), deposed Anthimus I of Constantinople, condemned opponents of the Council of Chalcedon
 Synod of Constantinople (543), a local council which condemned Origen of Alexandria
 Second Council of Constantinople (553), the Fifth Ecumenical Council
 Third Council of Constantinople (680), the Sixth Ecumenical Council
 Council of Constantinople (692), also called the Quinisext Council or Council in Trullo
 Council of Constantinople (754), better known as the Council of Hieria
 Council of Constantinople (815), a local council that restored iconoclasm
 Council of Constantinople (843), a local council that restored the veneration of icons (the 'Triumph of Orthodoxy')
 Council of Constantinople (861), a local council that confirmed the deposition of Ignatios of Constantinople and election of Photios I of Constantinople

Councils of differing interpretation between the Roman Catholic and Eastern Orthodox churches 
 Council of Constantinople (867), a local council convened by Photius to discuss Papal supremacy and the Filioque
 Fourth Council of Constantinople (Catholic Church) (869), considered the Eighth Ecumenical Council by the Catholic Church, deposed Photios I
 Fourth Council of Constantinople (Eastern Orthodox) (879), considered the Eighth Ecumenical Council by some Eastern Orthodox, also called the Photian Council as it reinstated Photios I

Councils after the schism (only attended by Eastern Orthodox bishops) 
 Council of Constantinople (1082), a local council convened to condemn John Italus
 Council of Constantinople (1094), also known as the Council of Blachernae (1094), a local council convened to condemn Leo of Chalcedon
 Council of Constantinople (1285), also known as the Council of Blachernae (1285), a local council that rejected the Roman Catholic Second Council of Lyon
 Fifth Council of Constantinople (1341–1351), considered the Ninth Ecumenical Council by some Orthodox, resolved the Hesychast controversy
 Synod of Constantinople (1484), condemned the Roman Catholic Council of Florence
 Council of Constantinople (1583), decided not to accept the Gregorian calendar
 Council of Constantinople (1593), approved the creation of the Moscow Patriarchate
 Council of Constantinople (1722), condemned all forms of Catholicisation
 Council of Constantinople (1756), affirmed the necessity of rebaptism for Roman Catholics converting to Orthodox Christianity
 Council of Constantinople (1848), issued the Encyclical of the Eastern Patriarchs, a reply to Pope Pius IX's In Suprema Petri Apostoli Sede epistle (also titled the Epistle to the Easterners)
 Council of Constantinople (1872), condemned phyletism as a non-Orthodox schismatic movement
 Council of Constantinople (1923), a major council, (although not ecumenical,) introduced several reforms, most controversially the revised Julian calendar reform